Joseph Demers may refer to:

Joseph Demers (Quebec MLA) (1861–1936), member of the Legislative Assembly of Quebec, representing Mégantic from 1912 to 1916
Joseph Demers (Quebec MP) (1871–1940), member of the Canadian Parliament, representing St. Johns—Iberville from 1906 to 1922